The 1965 European Cup was the 1st edition of the European Cup of athletics.

The Finals were held in West Germany, Stuttgart (men) and Kassel (women).

Final
Held in Stuttgart on 11 and 12 September (men) and Kassel on 19 September (women).

Team standings

Results summary

Men's events

Women's events

Semifinals

Men
All semifinals were held on 21 and 22 August.

Semifinal 1
Held in Rome

Semifinal 2
Held in Zagreb

Semifinal 3
Held in Oslo

Women
All semifinals were held on 22 August.

Semifinal 1
Held in Leipzig

Semifinal 2
Held in Fontainebleau

Semifinal 3
Held in Constanța

Preliminaries

Men
All preliminaries were held on 26-27 July.

Preliminary 1
Held in Vienna

Preliminary 2
Held in Enschede

References

External links
European Cup results (Men) from GBR Athletics
European Cup results (Women) from GBR Athletics

European Cup (athletics)
European Cup
1965 in European sport
1965 in German sport
International athletics competitions hosted by West Germany
Sport in Kassel
20th century in Kassel